Lady in the Iron Mask is a 1952 American adventure film directed by Ralph Murphy, produced by Walter Wanger and starring Louis Hayward as D'Artagnan and Patricia Medina in the titular role.  Alan Hale, Jr. portrays Porthos, Judd Holdren plays Aramis, and Steve Brodie appears as Athos in this Three Musketeers adventure film, a reworking of Douglas Fairbanks' 1929 screen epic The Iron Mask, an adaptation of the last section of the 1847-1850 novel The Vicomte de Bragelonne by Alexandre Dumas, père, which is itself based on the French legend of the Man in the Iron Mask.

Louis Hayward had played the dual role of the imprisoned prince and his twin in the 1939 version The Man in the Iron Mask while Alan Hale, Sr. portrayed Porthos, and in what may have been an instance of stunt casting, the same part was subsequently played by his lookalike son Alan Hale, Jr. in Lady in the Iron Mask thirteen years later.

Plot

Cast
Louis Hayward	 ...	
D'Artagnan
Patricia Medina	 ...	
Princess Anne / Princess Louise
Alan Hale, Jr.	 ...	
Porthos
Judd Holdren	 ...	
Aramis
Steve Brodie	 ...	
Athos
John Sutton	 ...	
Duke de Valdac
Hal Gerard	 ...	
Philip of Spain
Lester Matthews	 ...	
Prime Minister Rochard
John Dehner	 ...	
Count de Fourrier

References

External links

1952 films
1950s historical adventure films
American historical adventure films
20th Century Fox films
Films scored by Dimitri Tiomkin
Films based on The Vicomte of Bragelonne: Ten Years Later
Films produced by Walter Wanger
Man in the Iron Mask
Films with screenplays by Aubrey Wisberg
Twins in fiction
1950s English-language films
Films directed by Ralph Murphy
1950s American films